This is a list of Spanish football transfers for the January sale in the 2011–12 season of La Liga and Segunda División. Only moves from La Liga and Segunda División are listed.

The winter transfer window opened on 1 January 2012, although a few transfers took place prior to that date. The window will close at midnight on 1 February 2012. Players without a club can join one at any time, either during or in between transfer windows. Clubs below La Liga level can also sign players on loan at any time. If need be, clubs can sign a goalkeeper on an emergency loan, if all others are unavailable.

Winter 2011–12 transfer window

See also
List of Spanish football transfers summer 2011

References

Transfers
Spanish
2011–12